Communication is the seventh studio album by Bugskull, released on November 17, 2009 by Digitalis Recordings.

Track listing

Personnel 
Adapted from the Communication liner notes.
 Sean Byrne – lead vocals, instruments
 Mark Hansen – organ (A4)
 Janet Weiss – guitar (B5)

Release history

References 

2009 albums
Bugskull albums